Northern Thunder might refer to:

 Northern Fury FC, a former soccer club based in Townsville, Queensland.
 Northern Thunder RLFC, a rugby league club in the Melbourne Rugby League.
 Northern Thunder, a netball team that was later renamed Manchester Thunder.